Valentina Ivanovna Popova (born 21 November 1960 in Sumgait) is a former Soviet, and then Slovak, international table tennis player.

Table tennis career
From 1976 to 1994, she won 18 medals at the Table Tennis European Championships. At the European Championships in 1984, she won all four possible gold medals (singles, team (USSR), doubles (with Narine Antonyan), and mixed doubles (with Jacques Secretin), becoming the second ever absolute European women table tennis champion (Zoja Rudnova was the first one to do that in 1970).

She is a multiple USSR National champion - six times in singles, five times in doubles, and three times in mixed doubles.

See also
 List of table tennis players

References

External links
 
 
 
 

1960 births
Living people
Russian female table tennis players
Slovak female table tennis players
Soviet table tennis players
Table tennis players at the 1988 Summer Olympics
Table tennis players at the 1992 Summer Olympics
Table tennis players at the 1996 Summer Olympics
Olympic table tennis players of the Soviet Union
Olympic table tennis players of the Unified Team
Olympic table tennis players of Slovakia
People from Sumgait